The 1973 Minnesota Golden Gophers football team represented the University of Minnesota in the 1973 Big Ten Conference football season. In their second year under head coach Cal Stoll, the Golden Gophers compiled a 7–4 record but were outscored by their opponents by a combined total of 295 to 260. 
 
End Steve Neils and offensive tackle Matt Herkenhoff shared the team's Most Valuable Player award. Neils and end Keith Fahnhorst were named All-Big Ten first team.  Offensive guard Darrel Bunge and wide receiver Rick Upchurch were named All-Big Ten second team.  Defensive lineman Jeff Gunderson was named Academic All-Big Ten.

Total attendance for the season was 245,706, which averaged to 40,951. The season high for attendance was against Nebraska.

Schedule

Personnel

Season summary

at Ohio State

North Dakota

at Kansas

Nebraska

Indiana

at Iowa

Michigan

at Northwestern

Purdue

at Illinois

Wisconsin

References

Minnesota
Minnesota Golden Gophers football seasons
Minnesota Golden Gophers football